Maliampurackal Chacko Punnoose, known as Navodaya Appachan (6 February 1924 – 23 April 2012) was an Indian film producer, director and entrepreneur. He is best known for his work in Malayalam cinema, especially as the founder of Navodaya Studio.

Appachan was born to the Maliampurackal family at Pulinkunnoo and was an alumnus of St. Xavier's College, Palayamkottai. 

Movies he produced include Manjil Virinja Pookkal and My Dear Kuttichathan. The latter was the first 3D movie made in India and released as Chota Chetan in Hindi. He is the founder of Navodaya Studio. He created Bible Ki Kahaniyan on Doordarshan. He first became involved in the film industry with his brother Kunchacko, at Udaya Studio. The first Cinemascope film in Malayalam was directed by him, and the Malayalam Padayottam, which was the first indigenously shot 70mm movie in South India, was produced by him. He founded Kishkinta, India's first theme park, in Chennai. He was given the 2011 J. C. Daniel Award for contributions to Malayalam cinema.

Death 
Appachan died of cancer aged 88 on 23 April 2012 at Lakeshore Hospital in Kochi.

Filmography

Awards
He won Filmfare Award for Best Film - Malayalam - Chamaram (1980)

References

External links 
 

1930s births
2012 deaths
J. C. Daniel Award winners
Kerala State Film Award winners
Producers who won the Best Popular Film Providing Wholesome Entertainment National Film Award
Film producers from Kerala
Malayalam film producers
Malayalam film directors
Film directors from Kerala
20th-century Indian film directors
20th-century Indian businesspeople
People from Alappuzha district
Filmmaking pioneers
Odia film directors
Deaths from cancer in India